Chesterfield Inlet Airport  is located  northwest of Chesterfield Inlet, Nunavut, Canada, and is operated by the government of Nunavut.

Airlines and destinations

References

External links
Page about this airport on COPA's Places to Fly airport directory

Certified airports in the Kivalliq Region